Upninkai Eldership is a Lithuanian eldership, located in an eastern part of Jonava District Municipality. As of 2020, administrative centre and largest settlement within eldership was Upninkai.

Geography

 Rivers: Širvinta;

Populated places 
Following settlements are located in the Upninkai Eldership (as for 2011 census):

Villages: Alekniškis, Apeikiškiai, Arnotiškiai, Aukštakaimis, Ąžuolynė, Bajoriškiai, Baltromiškė, Būda, Dienovidžiai, Dubiai, Eglinė, Galijevka, Gegutės, Gegužinė, Jakimauka, Jurkonys, Karčiai, Karčiškiai, Karveliškiai, Keižonys, Kernaviškiai, Kryžiauka, Kunigiškiai, Kūniškiai, Liudvikiškiai, Liukonėliai, Makštava, Mančiušėnai, Mantromiškiai, Medinai, Padaigai, Pageležiai, Pakalniškis, Perelozai, Rizgonys, Saleninkai, Santaka, Sergiejevka, Šakiai, Šilėnai, Upninkai, Upninkėliai, Užupės, Vanagiškis, Vareikiai, Vyšnialaukis

Demography

References

Elderships in Jonava District Municipality